Juan Carlos Ceballos Pinto (born 7 April 1983 in Barcelona, Catalonia) is a Spanish professional footballer who plays for SFC Minerva as a right back.

Honours
Spain U19
UEFA European Under-19 Championship: 2002

Spain U17
Meridian Cup: 2001

References

External links

1983 births
Living people
Footballers from Barcelona
Spanish footballers
Association football defenders
Segunda División players
Segunda División B players
Tercera División players
RCD Espanyol B footballers
RCD Espanyol footballers
Atlético Levante UD players
Levante UD footballers
Ciudad de Murcia footballers
Racing de Ferrol footballers
Córdoba CF players
CF Badalona players
FC Cartagena footballers
Cádiz CF players
FC Jumilla players
Mar Menor FC players
Spain youth international footballers